Nirjuli is a town in the Papum Pare district of Arunachal Pradesh in Northeast India. The National Highway 52A (now NH 415) is a highway that runs through the town and provides the primary platform for easy transportation and access within the town and to the outside world as well. The Pare River, the only river flowing by the town which adds to its exquisite beauty, and ultimately flows into the Brahmaputra River.

The railway transportation project which will soon connect Nirjuli and Guwahati is under construction.

Climate

A warm but pleasant climate prevails in Nirjuli all through the year. Post Monsoon, winter and spring (October to April) are marked with cool climates, especially winter months. Summer during May to June and monsoon season during July to September are also pleasant. Summer temperature can soar up to  some days. Breezes from Himalayan ranges make the winter climate freezing cool.

Culture 
Nyokum celebrated with zeal, main venue being Nyokum Nia Hall where Local festivals as well as Music and Fashion shows are held.

Education
The key academic resource is the North Eastern Regional Institute of Science and Technology (NERIST) (Deemed University), under MHRD, Government of India, producing a plethora of skillful engineers and entrepreneurs every year, currently working in various parts of the globe. Kendriya Vidyalaya and Vivekananda Kendra Vidyalaya, under CBSE, are among the best schools in the town besides other Secondary and Higher Secondary schools under the State Board of Arunachal Pradesh which lays the foundation of Education in Nirjuli.

Economy 
Tourism in Nirjuli is not as lucrative as other districts in Arunachal Pradesh. Horticulture too has a great influence on the economy of the town. The climate and topography of Nirjuli is conducive to horticultural products like ginger, spices, bamboo, cardamom and mushroom, aromatic and medicinal plants. The livestocks are the sources of milk, meat, manure, egg; thus contributing to the family as well as  economy. In recent years, pisciculture has also become an important source of employment and income in Nirjuli.

The major industries are sawmills and plywood (both of them are illegal in the state). Rice mills, fruit preservation units and handloom handicrafts contributes their share to the economy of the state 

The State Bank of India is the only bank in the town which is located inside the NERIST campus. The financial services provided by the bank include ATM cards, bank notes, coins, debit cards, as well as other services such as lending and processing money, taking deposits, maintaining their salary accounts, extending cheques, loans, credit cards, ATM cards, debit cards, etc. The town is provided with three ATM service, two of the SBI and the other of the Axis Bank. The bank also provides with i-Banking and telephone banking. With the proliferation of globalization, banks have become an integral element in the economy and the banks of Nirjuli are no exception to this. In fact, the banks are the best way to raise funds within the town. The Railway Transportation Project which will soon connect Nirjuli and Guwahati is of great importance for the economy of the town and the whole state as well as railway is the cheapest, easiest and most flexible means of transport.

Transportation
The national highway NH-52A passes through Nirjuli and connects this place to the rest of the nation. 
By road, one can reach Nirjuli by bus service from Guwahati via Banderdewa. Various bus services are available for transportation, including Network Bus service, Blue Hill Bus service, and Volvo. It takes 8 to 10 hours to reach Nirjuli from Guwahati. Nirjuli can also be reached by train from Rangia or Guwahati to reach Naharlagun. From Naharlagun vehicles are available for Nirjuli.

Travelers should carry a valid inner line permit to enter the gate of Banderdewa. This inner line permit can either be collected from the District Collector's office from Naharlagun. The inner line permit can also be obtained in any state from the respective district collectors. Foreigners who come to visit the state need a different permit known as Protected Area Permit (PAP)

By air, one can reach by Pawan Hans helicopter service from Guwahati. The helicopter services are available from Lokpriya Gopinath Bordoloi International Airport, Guwahati (airport code: GAU) thrice a week.

Under the Jawaharlal Nehru National Urban Renewal Mission, three projects costing US$39.2 million have been sanctioned for Itanagar, the state capital. The urban transport project was approved in 2009 by which local urban transportation services were started by JNNURM in Nirjuli. The Railway Transportation Project is under construction and shall be completed very soon.

Lodging
There are few places to lodge in the town, the nearest place with accommodation is Naharlagun which is around 8 km from Nirjuli and can be reached using local transport in 10–15 minutes. Newly selected NERIST candidates can stay at the institute guest house by obtaining permission from the registrar of NERIST.

Demographics 
The majority of the population belongs to the Nyishi tribe. Other tribes like Adi, Apatani,  Nocte, Wangcho, Monpa, Galo and many other subtribes reside too.

People come from many different states to live, work and study here. Staffs and students of NERIST are one of the best example who come from different parts of the country.

References 

Cities and towns in Papum Pare district